Aslett is a surname. Notable people by that name include:

 Don Aslett (born 1935), American entrepreneur and author who specializes in cleaning and housekeeping products, services, and techniques.
 Derek Aslett (born 1958), former English cricketer who played for Kent County Cricket Club between 1981 and 1987.
 Robert Aslett, assistant cashier at the Bank of England